Chandramana Govindan Namboothiri was a famous Kathakali artist from the South Indian state of Kerala

Personal life
C.G Namboothiri was born in Chandramana Illam, Asamannoor, to C.S. Govindan Namboodiri (After whom he was named) and mother Devaki Antharjanam. He has a wife and four sons.

Kathakali
Govindan Namboothiri started learning Kathakali in 1947 under Kavunkal Chathunni Panikkar. After the 3 years study in Kerala he went to Darpana Academy of Performing Arts, Ahmedabad. Govindan Namboothiri also learnt under Kalamandalam Krishnan Nair and Mankulam Vishnu Namboothiri.

Awards
Kerala Sangeetha Nataka Akademi Award, 1994
"Senior Fellowship" for the research on 'Ilakiyattam' from Dept of Human Resources, 1997–1998
Awarded "Thulasivanam" award for classical arts, 1999

See also
Kathakali
Kalamandalam Krishnan Nair
Kerala Kalamandalam

References

 Chandramana Govindan Namboothiri, cyberkerala.com

Malayali people
Kathakali exponents
People from Ernakulam district
Dancers from Kerala
Indian male dancers
Year of birth missing (living people)
Recipients of the Kerala Sangeetha Nataka Akademi Award